The Netanyahus: An Account of a Minor and Ultimately Even Negligible Episode in the History of a Very Famous Family is a 2021 novel by Joshua Cohen. It was awarded the 2022 Pulitzer Prize for Fiction.

The book centers on a fictionalized account of Harold Bloom's encounter with Benzion Netanyahu and his family, including his son, Benjamin Netanyahu, at an upstate New York college in the late 1950s, blending history, fiction, and humor.

Audiobook
Cohen recorded an audiobook version with Malcolm Gladwell's production company Pushkin Industries, which features voice work from David Duchovny.

Reception and accolades

Critical reception
The novel received mostly favorable reviews from critics. In a positive review for The New York Times Book Review, Taffy Brodesser-Akner referred to the novel as "an infuriating, frustrating, pretentious piece of work — and also absorbing, delightful, hilarious, breathtaking and the best and most relevant novel I’ve read in what feels like forever". David Isaacs praised Cohen's wit at the sentence level but questioned his success in conveying a sense of depth, describing the novel in Literary Review as "erudite, occasionally hilarious and eventually unhinged."

Awards and honors
The Netanyahus won the 2022 Pulitzer Prize for Fiction. The Pulitzer citation for the novel described it as "A mordant, linguistically deft historical novel about the ambiguities of the Jewish-American experience, presenting ideas and disputes as volatile as its tightly-wound plot."

References

2021 American novels
Novels set in the 1950s
Novels set in the United States
New York Review Books books
Cultural depictions of Benjamin Netanyahu
Pulitzer Prize for Fiction-winning works